A chili dog is a hot dog served in a bun and topped with a meat sauce, such as chili con carne. Additional toppings may include cheese, onions, and mustard.  The style has multiple regional variations in the United States, many calling for specific and unique sauce ingredients, types of hot dogs, or types of buns and referred to regionally under region-specific names.

Regional variations

Texas wiener

In New Jersey and Pennsylvania, the "Texas hot dog", "Texas chili dog." "Texas hot'," or "Texas wiener" is a hot dog with chili or hot sauce; it is served in variations with assorted condiments. The Texas wiener was created in Paterson, New Jersey, before 1920 and in Altoona, Pennsylvania, by Peter "George" Koufougeorgas in 1918 and originally called Texas Hot Wieners. The "Texas" reference is to the chili sauce used on the dogs.  It is considered a unique regional hot dog style, partly because in addition to the chili or hot sauce, the hot dog itself is always deep-fried.  From its origins, the invention spread to the Pennsylvania cities of Scranton and Philadelphia. By the 1920s, it had reached Western New York, where numerous longstanding hot dog stands still remain, including a stand run by the Rigas Family (dating to 1921) and Ted's Hot Dogs (which opened in 1927).

Coney Island hot dog

In southeastern Michigan, a Coney Island hot dog is a European-style Frankfurter Würstel (Vienna sausage) of German origin with a natural lamb or sheep casing, topped with a beef heart-based sauce, which was developed by Macedonian and Greek immigrants in the area. It has several local variations, including Detroit style, Flint style, and Jackson style.

Hot wiener

In Rhode Island the hot wiener or New York System wiener is a staple of the food culture and is served at "New York System" restaurants. The traditional wiener is made with a small, thin hot dog made of veal and pork, giving it a different taste from a traditional beef hot dog, served in a steamed bun, and topped with celery salt, yellow mustard, chopped onions, and a seasoned meat sauce.

Michigan hot dog

In the North Country of New York State, a Michigan hot dog, or "Michigan", is a steamed hot dog on a steamed bun topped with a meaty sauce, generally referred to as "Michigan sauce."

Cheese coney

In Greater Cincinnati, as well as parts of northern Oklahoma, such as in Tulsa and Stillwater, OK, Cheese coneys or Coney Islands (without the cheese) are hot dogs in buns topped with Cincinnati chili (a Greek-inspired meat sauce), onions, mustard, and cheese.

Carolina style

In North Carolina, hot dogs topped with chili, onions, and either mustard or slaw are referred to as "Carolina style", which is also used to refer to hamburgers with similar toppings.

Half-smoke

In Washington, D.C., the half-smoke is similar to a hot dog, but usually larger, spicier, and with more coarsely-ground meat, the sausage is often half-pork and half-beef, smoked, and served with herbs, onion, and chili sauce.

See also

 Chili burger
 Hot dog variations
 Sonic the Hedgehog, whose favorite food is chili dogs
 List of hot dogs
 List of sausage dishes

References

Further reading
A Brief History of the Hot Texas Wiener (Library of Congress / American Memory)

External links

Geography Quiz: Where's the Texas in the Texas Wiener? (The New York Times)

Hot dogs
Chili con carne
American meat dishes